The Tupolev Tu-141 Strizh ("Swift") is a Soviet reconnaissance drone that served with the Soviet Army during the late 1970s and 1980s, as well as the Ukrainian Armed Forces since 2014.

Development

The Tu-141 was a follow-on to the Tupolev Tu-123 and is a relatively large, medium-range reconnaissance drone. It is designed to undertake reconnaissance missions within a  radius, flying at transsonic speeds. It can carry a range of payloads, including film cameras, infrared imagers, EO imagers, and imaging radar..    

As with previous Tupolev designs, it has a dart-like rear-mounted delta wing, forward-mounted canards, and a KR-17A turbojet engine mounted above the tail. It is launched from a trailer using a solid-propellant booster and lands with the aid of a tail-mounted parachute.

Operation and incidents 
The Tu-141 was in Soviet service from 1979 to 1989, mostly on the western borders of the Soviet Union.

During the Russo-Ukrainian War  
It was pressed back into service by the Ukrainian Air Force after 2014 for the War in Donbas.

During the 2022 Russian invasion of Ukraine 
On 8 March 2022, a Tu-141 reconnaissance drone was reported crashed in Ukraine.

Before it crashed, it had flown over Romania and Hungary. There were no casualties. The Ukrainian Air Force said that the drone did not belong to them. The Russian Embassy in Zagreb stated that Russian forces had not had such drones in their arsenal since the collapse of the Soviet Union in 1991. The Croatian president, Zoran Milanović, said it was clear the drone came from the direction of Ukraine, entering Croatia after flying over Hungary. On 15 March, an undisclosed source close to the ministry of defence of Croatia was cited in the Croatian news magazine Nacional as saying that the investigation had concluded that the crashed drone belonged to the Armed Forces of Ukraine and carried a bomb that was meant for striking Russia's positions, but the drone had strayed off course and crashed after it ran out of fuel.

On 3 July 2022, the governor of the Kursk region wrote on Telegram that "our air defenses shot down two Ukrainian Strizh drones".

On 5 December 2022, explosions were reported at two Russian airbases: the one at Engels-2 reportedly damaged two Tu-95s according to Baza; the other at the Dyagilevo military airbase near Ryazan, destroyed a fuel truck, damaged a Tu-22M3 and killed three, injuring five. The Russian Ministry of Defense said that Ukraine struck these bases with Soviet-made jet drones, and that the drones were subsequently shot down at low altitude when approaching the air bases. The Ministry of Defense of Ukraine has not confirmed the information.

On 26 December 2022, at midnight, explosions were again reported at Engels-2. Air sirens were reported being heard at the base and surrounding areas. The local governor Roman Busargin reported no damage to "civilian infrastructure". At least two explosions were heard. These explosions have been reported by both the Ukrainian and Russian media. Three people from the “technical staff” have reportedly been killed. According to Russian television, "A Ukrainian unmanned aerial vehicle was shot down at low altitude while approaching the Engels military airfield in the Saratov region," Ukrainian and Russian social media accounts reported a number of bombers have been destroyed. However Reuters could not confirm these claims. A modified Tu-141 was used to undertake the attack.

Specifications

References

 Gordon, Yefim and Vladimir Rigmant. OKB Tupolev: A History of the Design Bureau and its Aircraft. Hinkley, UK: Midland Publishing, 2005. .
 Munson, Kenneth. "Unmanned Aerial Vehicles Directory: Part 2". Air International, August 1997, Vol 53 No 2. pp. 100–108.

This article contains material that originally came from the web article Unmanned Aerial Vehicles by Greg Goebel, which exists in the Public Domain.

External links

Tupolev Tu-141 on Khodynskoe Pole in Moscow

Tu-0141
Canard aircraft
1970s Soviet military reconnaissance aircraft
Unmanned aerial vehicles of the Soviet Union
Delta-wing aircraft
Single-engined jet aircraft